Chaubattakhal is a tehsil in the Pauri Garhwal district of the Garhwal division of Uttarakhand, India. According to information in the 2011 Census, the sub-district code of Chaubattakhal block is 00312. There are about 285 villages in Chaubattakhal block. 

Dantha - Malkot connecting road is about  linked with Chaubattakhal.

Villages in Pauri Garhwal district